In Greek mythology, Chrysanthis was a female figure associated with the goddess Demeter.

Mythology 
According to an Argive legend recorded by Pausanias, Chrysanthis informed Demeter of the abduction of Persephone by Hades when Demeter was visiting Pelasgus in Argos. Thus, in the Argive account Chrysanthis substitutes for Hecate of the Homeric hymn to Demeter.

A relief uncovered near Lerna portrays an altar, to the left of which stands Demeter, to the right stand Chrysanthis, her husband Mysius, and two maidens presumed to be their daughters. Mysius is otherwise known as a native of Argos who offered hospitality to Demeter and dedicated a sanctuary to her, from which circumstance the goddess received the surname Mysia. The family may be seen as a parallel to Celeus, Metaneira, and their daughters.

Notes

References 
Realencyclopädie der Classischen Altertumswissenschaft, Band III, Halbband 6, Campanus ager-Claudius (1899), s. 2483, u. Chrysanthis
 Grimal, Pierre. A Concise Dictionary of Classical mythology. Basil Blackwell Ltd, 1990. – p. 96
Lyons, Deborah. Gender and Immortality: Heroines in Ancient Greek Myth and Cult. Appendix – A Catalogue of Heroines, under Chrysanthis
Pausanias, Description of Greece with an English Translation by W.H.S. Jones, Litt.D., and H.A. Ormerod, M.A., in 4 Volumes. Cambridge, MA, Harvard University Press; London, William Heinemann Ltd. 1918. . Online version at the Perseus Digital Library
Pausanias, Graeciae Descriptio. 3 vols. Leipzig, Teubner. 1903.  Greek text available at the Perseus Digital Library.

Women in Greek mythology
Mythology of Argos
Demeter